Viswasarayi Kalavathi is an Indian politician. She was elected to the Andhra Pradesh Legislative Assembly from Palakonda as a member of the YSR Congress Party.

References

YSR Congress Party politicians
Members of the Andhra Pradesh Legislative Assembly
Living people
Year of birth missing (living people)